This is a list of notable psephologists.

In surname alphabetical order:

 Michael Barone
 John Bowman
 David Butler
 Robert Chapman
 Nate Cohn
 F. W. S. Craig
 John Curtice
 Harry Enten
 Thomas Ferguson
Michael Gallagher (academic)
 Curtis Gans
 Luis Eduardo González
 Antony Green
 Rajeeva Karandikar
 Peter Kellner
 Anthony King
 Steve Kornacki
 Alan Lichtman
 Malcolm Mackerras
 Robert McKenzie
 G. Elliott Morris
 Helmut Norpoth
 Samuel L. Popkin
 Jon Ralston
 Mahesh Rangarajan
 Ken Ritchie
 Eric Rosenfeld
 Prannoy Roy
 Larry Sabato
 Matthew Shugart
 Nate Silver
Matt Singh
 Michael Steed
 Andrew S. Tanenbaum
 Michael Thrasher
 Sean Trende
 Dave Wasserman
 Yogendra Yadav

See also 
 Lists of people by occupation

References

Lists of scientists by field